Bonda Meedum (Sinhala: බොඳ මීදුම්) is a Sri Lankan television drama based on "Bonda Meedum", a popular series of novels created by Sri Lankan writer Sujeewa Prasanna Arachchi. The series debuted on 15 September 2010 and concluded on 2 September 2011. Independent Television Network was the official broadcaster for the serial. Screening at the 8.30 pm slot, the teledrama exceeded even the popularity of the novel. Udari Warnakulasooriya and Saranga Disasekara were awarded most popular female and male actors of the year, respectively, at the 16th Sumathi Awards 2011.

Plot

Dhanuka is a handsome, innocent boy in his early 20s. He lives in Matale with his parents and sister. His father, Dharmasena sends him to his best friend, Senarath Maliyadda, who is a rich businessman in Nawala, in order to get a job at his company. Dhanuka arrives to Maliyadda's house and Maliyadda treats him as his own son. But, Maliyadda's only daughter, Sansala treats Dhanuka as an outsider and insults him at multiple times. She has received a marriage proposal from her elder cousin, Saliya, who only loves her to get property. Dhanuka doesn't care about Sansala's misdeeds and slowly loves her. His manager, Senaka realizes Dhanuka's matter and supports him.

Soon, Saliya's mother learns about Dhanuka and plans to send him again to Matale. Then, Saliya's sister calls to Maliyadda's house and introduces her as Dhanuka's girlfriend. Sansala treats him badly, leading Dhanuka to breakdown and leave home. Sansala regrets and feels for Dhanuka slowly. Later, she learns about her aunt's plan and forgives Dhanuka.

Sansala now spends time sadly because of Saliya's behavior. One Day, Dhanuka confesses his love to Sansala at Temple. Sansala is also confesses her love. Dhanuka gets happy and promises her to save her from Saliya. Saliya has a secret girlfriend, Minoli. Dhanuka warns Saliya after learning that he slapped Sansala badly. To avenge him, Saliya beats up Dhanuka and reveals his and Sansala's relationship to Maliyadda. Enraged, Maliyadda expels Dhanuka from his job and fixes Sansala and Saliya's marriage, much to Sansala's dismay. At that time, Dhanuka gets a waiter job at hotel, but he has to quit from that after he meets Maliyadda and Sansala at hotel.

Saliya warns Sansala telling that he will get all property after marriage. Her servant, Kamala tells her to escape from home. But, before the wedding day, Saliya gets arrested at Maliyadda's house for a robbery case. Maliyadda sees Saliya's true colors and breaks all ties with him. Dhanuka does some part-time jobs at town with his best friend, Viraj. Dharmasena passes away from a heart attack. After that, Maliyadda decides to help them.

Meanwhile, Saliya returns and beats Sansala to take revenge. Sansala falls into a coma and Saliya gets sentenced for 4 years. Maliyadda realizes his mistake and accepts Dhanuka. Dhanuka starts Sansala's treatment from an ayurvedic doctor, who reveals him that Sansala's recovery time is uncertain. With the help of his family and friends, Dhanuka opens a farm and eventually becomes successful. 4 years later, Saliya is released from jail and he shares a bond with a little girl, Shanali. However, He gets injured in a bomb blast. Before dying, Saliya learns that Shanali is being his and Minoli's daughter. At the end, Sansala wakes up from coma and is fully recovered. Finally, Dhanuka and Sansala reunite and live happily.

Cast and characters

Main
 Udari Warnakulasooriya as Sansala Dharmasena (née Maliyadda) – Dhanuka's fiancée and wife
 Saranga Disasekara as Dhanuka Dharmasena – Sansala's fiancé and husband

Supporting
 Gayan Wickramathilaka as Saliya Silva – Sansala and Kasun's cousin-brother
 Buddhadasa Vithanarachchi as Senarath Maliyadda – Sansala and Kasun's father
 Janak Premalal as Dharmasena – Dhanuka and Iroshini's father
 Madhani Malwaththa as Vimala Dharmasena – Dhanuka and Iroshini's mother
 Thishuna Perera as Kasun Maliyadda – Sansala's brother
 Meena Kumari as Charuni Silva (née Maliyadda) – Sansala and Kasun's elder aunt
 Anushi Rajapaksha as Aruni Maliyadda – Sansala and Kasun's younger aunt
 Uddika Premarathna as Senaka – Dhanuka's friend at his first job
 Rajitha Hiran as Kumara – Male servant at Maliyadda's house
 Gayana Sudharshani as Kamala – Female servant at Maliyadda's house
 Ananda Wickramage as Douglas Silva – Charuni's husband
 Piyumi Purasinghe as Iroshini Dharmasena – Dhanuka's sister and Viraj's wife
 Sanjula Diwarathna as Viraj – Dhanuka's best friend and Iroshini's husband
 Chathurani Nuwangika as Darshani Silva – Saliya's sister and Senaka's wife
 Akila Sandakelum as Asanga – Dharshani's ex-fiancé
 Gihan Fernando as Palawaththe Victor – Minoli's brother and Saliya's rival
 Gayesha Perera as Minoli – Saliya's fiancée
 Roopa Gomas as Minoli and Victor's aunt
 Sada Mihiri Amrasingha as Mayumi – Sansala's best friend
 Manjula Moragaha as Agriculture Inspector – A young man who shows interest to Iroshini
 Wasantha Kumaravila as Chaliya – One of Saliya's sidekicks
 Rohan Ranatunga as Sumith – One of Saliya's sidekicks
 G. R. Perera as Habarana Weda Mahattaya – Ayurvedic doctor who recovered Sansala

Music
 Sihina Isawwen Enna – Amila Nadeeshani, Surendra Perera

Awards
 The most popular actress of the year (16th Sumathi Tele Awards 2011): Udari Warnakulasuriya (Bonda Meedum)
 The most popular actor of the year (16th Sumathi Tele Awards 2011): Saranga Disasekara (Bonda Meedum)

Slogan
 Sinhala: ජීවත්වන්නෙත් – මියයන්නෙත් ඔබේ ආදරය වෙනුවෙනි...

References

External links
 Official website 
 Aadara desak Udari Warnakulasuriya's Sinhala Teledrama all episodes on lakbima TV
 Boda Meedum Actress Udari Warnakulasuriya's latest teledrama 'Sayuri' on tharunaya watch all episodes.

Sri Lankan television shows
Sri Lankan drama television series
2010 Sri Lankan television series debuts
2011 Sri Lankan television series endings
2010s Sri Lankan television series
Independent Television Network original programming